Carlia caesius is a species of skink in the genus Carlia. It is endemic to Irian Jaya in Indonesia.

References

Carlia
Reptiles described in 2006
Reptiles of Indonesia
Endemic fauna of Indonesia
Taxa named by George Robert Zug
Taxa named by Allen Allison